List of British Jews is a list of prominent Jews from the United Kingdom and its predecessor states.

Although the first Jews may have arrived on the island of Great Britain with the Romans, it was not until the Norman Conquest of William the Conqueror in 1066 that organised Jewish communities first appeared in England.  These existed until 1290 when the Jewish population of England was expelled by King Edward I of England.

There was never a corresponding expulsion from Scotland.  The eminent scholar David Daiches states in his autobiographical Two Worlds: A Scottish born Jewish Childhood that there are grounds for saying that Scotland is the only Immigrant country with no history of state persecution of Jews.

Jews were re-admitted to England and Wales in 1656 by Oliver Cromwell.  Slightly more than 200 years later, in 1858 they were emancipated, that is, accepted as full citizens.  In the late 19th century, there was mass Jewish immigration to England from Russia due to Russian domestic policy.  In the 1930s, the country accepted many refugees from Nazism.  The Jewish population peaked at 450,000, but has since declined due to low birth-rate, intermarriage and emigration, mainly of the younger generation to Israel.  According to the 2001 census, the current population is around 295,000, most of whom live in London.

Academic figures

Scientists
 See List of British Jewish scientists, which includes economists.

Historians

 David Abulafia, professor of history, University of Cambridge
 Geoffrey Alderman, historian
 Richard David Barnett, museum curator and archaeologist
 Norman Cohn, historian
 Isaac Deutscher, historian
 Geoffrey Rudolph Elton, historian
 Samuel Finer
 Sir Moses I. Finley, historian and sociologist
 Sir Martin Gilbert, historian
 Martin Goodman
 Philip Guedalla, biographer
 Eric Hobsbawm, historian and Communist theoretician
 Jonathan Israel, historian
 Joseph Jacobs, editor of the Jewish Encyclopedia
 Lisa Jardine, historian
 Tony Judt, Director of the Erich Maria Remarque Institute at New York University
 Elie Kedourie, historian and political scientist
 Otto Kurz, historian
 Bernard Lewis, historian
 David Malcolm Lewis, professor of history, University of Oxford
 Hyam Maccoby, professor of history
 Sir Philip Magnus, 1st Baronet, educationalist and politician
 Sir Philip Magnus-Allcroft, 2nd Baronet, biographer
 Shula Marks, expert on African history
 Arnaldo Momigliano, professor of history, University College London
 Lewis Bernstein Namier, historian (converted to Anglicanism)
 Sir Francis Palgrave (born Cohen) (1768–1861), historian
Ilan Pappé Israeli born New Historian, author of The Ethnic Cleansing of Palestine and professor at The University of Exeter
 Sir Michael Postan, historian
 Cecil Roth, historian and editor of the Encyclopaedia Judaica
 Simon Schama, historian
 Leonard Schapiro, historian
 Simon Sebag Montefiore, historian
 Charles Singer, historian of science
 Sir Aurel Stein, archeologist
 Barry Supple, British economic historian
 Geza Vermes

Medical

 Sir George Alberti, President, Royal College of Physicians
 Asher Asher, first Scottish Jewish doctor
 Henry Cohen, 1st Baron Cohen of Birkenhead, President of the Royal Society of Medicine
 Sir Ian Gainsford, dentist
 Sir Abraham Goldberg, Regius Professor of Medicine, University of Glasgow, 1923–2007
 Max Hamilton, psychiatrist
 Roderigo Lopez, New Christian doctor to Queen Elizabeth I
 John Henry Marks, former chairman of the British Medical Association
 Sir Jonathan Miller, physician and theatre director
 Leslie Turnberg, Baron Turnberg, professor, FMedSci
 Oliver Zangwill, professor of psychology

Philosophers
 Samuel Alexander, professor of philosophy at Manchester, born in Australia, the first Jewish fellow of an Oxbridge college
 Sir Alfred Ayer, philosopher, populariser of logical positivism (Jewish mother)
 Sir Isaiah Berlin, political philosopher
 Max Black, philosopher
 Gerald Cohen, Oxford professor of philosophy
 Laurence Jonathan Cohen, Oxford professor of philosophy
 Ernest Gellner, philosopher social scientist
 H. L. A. Hart, legal philosopher
 Brian Klug, Senior Research Fellow in Philosophy, St Benet's Hall, University of Oxford; concepts of race, antisemitism, Islamophobia, Jewish identity
 Stephan Korner, Bristol professor of philosophy
 Imre Lakatos, Hungarian-born philosopher
 Alexander Piatigorsky, philosopher, Buddhologist, writer
 Sir Karl Popper, philosopher of science (family became Lutheran)
 Jonathan Romain, minister of Maidenhead Jewish community and leader of the British reform movement
 Richard Rudolf Walzer
 Ludwig Wittgenstein, philosopher; Jewish grandparents on both sides of the family who had converted to Christianity in the 19th century; he was christened, raised and eventually buried as a Catholic
 Richard Wollheim

Social scientists

 Roy Clive Abraham, linguist
 Michael Balint, psychoanalyst (converted to Unitarianism)
 Zygmunt Bauman, sociologist
 Basil Bernstein, linguist
 Vernon Bogdanor, professor of politics
 Gerald Cohen, professor of social and political theory
 Arthur Lumley Davids, linguist and orientalist
 Norbert Elias, sociologist
 Herman Finer, political scientist
 Samuel Finer, political scientist
 Sir Moses I. Finley, historian and sociologist
 Meyer Fortes, anthropologist
 Eduard Fraenkel, philologist
 Anna Freud, child psychoanalyst
 Norman Geras, professor of government
 Morris Ginsberg, sociologist
 Max Gluckman, anthropologist
 Theodor Goldstücker, orientalist
 Jean Gottmann, professor of geography, Oxford University
 Julius Gould, sociologist
 David Hirsh, lecturer in sociology
 Paul Hirst, social theorist (Jewish mother)
 Marie Jahoda, psychology of discrimination
 Melanie Klein, child psychoanalyst
 Geoffrey Lewis Lewis, professor of Turkish
 Steven Lukes, political scientist
 Ashley Montagu, anthropologist and humanist
 Isaac Schapera, anthropologist
 Edward Ullendorff, linguist

Theologians and Hebraists
 Isaac Abendana, Hebraist
 Chimen Abramsky, professor of Hebrew
 Lionel Barnett, orientalist
 Abraham Benisch, Hebraist and editor of the Jewish Chronicle
 Immanuel Oscar Menahem Deutsch, Semitic scholar and orientalist
 Alfred Edersheim, Bible scholar
 Philip Ferdinand, professor of Hebrew
 Christian David Ginsburg, expert on the Masoretic text
 Ridley Haim Herschell, missionary
 Marcus Kalisch, Hebraist and Biblical commentator
 David Levi, Jewish scholar
 David Samuel Margoliouth, orientalist (family converted to Anglicanism)
 Hugh Montefiore, bishop
 Adolf Neubauer, Hebraist
 Stefan Reif, Cambridge academic
 Judah Segal, professor of Semitic languages
 Joseph Wolff, missionary

Others
 Sidney Greenbaum, Quain Professor of English Language and Literature, University College London 1983-90

Artists

Fine arts
 Frank Auerbach, painter
 Edith Birkin, painter
 David Bomberg, painter
 Sir Anthony Caro, sculptor
Benno Elkan, sculptor
 Sir Jacob Epstein, sculptor (UK-based)
 Hannah Frank, artist and sculptor
 Barnett Freedman, artist
 Lucian Freud, painter
 Abram Games
 Mark Gertler, painter
 Zoltán Glass, photographer
 Gluck (Hannah Gluckstein), artist
 Walter Goodman, painter
 Dora Gordine, artist and sculptor
 Harrison Marks, photographer
 Solomon Alexander Hart, painter
 Lily Delissa Joseph, painter
 Anish Kapoor, sculptor (Jewish mother)
 R. B. Kitaj, US-born painter
 Leon Kossoff:1926-2019 (The Guardian Leon Kossoff obituary)
 Jacob Kramer, painter
 Lennie Lee, Young British Artist; mixed media
 Linda McCartney, photographer
 Ruth Rix, painter
 Sir William Rothenstein
 Antony Armstrong-Jones, 1st Earl of Snowdon
 Isaac Snowman, painter
 Solomon Joseph Solomon, painter
 Alfred Wolmark, painter
 Berthold Wolpe, printer

Designers and architects
 Nicole Farhi, fashion designer
 John Frieda, hair stylist; father of actor Jordan Frieda
Ray Kelvin, fashion designer, founder of Ted Baker
 Denys Lasdun, architect
 Stella McCartney, fashion designer
 Erich Mendelsohn, architect
 Janet Reger, lingerie designer
 Vidal Sassoon, hair stylist
 Richard Seifert, architect

Arts and literature
 Sir Israel Gollancz, Shakespeare expert
 Sir Ernst Gombrich, art historian
 Sir Sidney Lee, editor of the Dictionary of National Biography and Shakespeare expert
 Siegbert Salomon Prawer, professor of German
 Sir Nicholas Serota, Director of the Tate Gallery, 1987–
 Ernest Simon, professor of Chinese
 Arthur Waley, poet, translator of Chinese and Japanese literature

Performing arts
 See List of British Jewish entertainers (includes classical musicians and actors as "entertainers").

Writers
 See List of British Jewish writers.

Business and the professions

Civil service
 Abraham Manie Adelstein, government statistician
 Sir Hermann Bondi, Chief Scientific Adviser to the Ministry of Defence and the Department of Energy
Sir Andrew Cohen, colonial administrator
 Eugene Grebenik, first head of the Civil Service College
 Hans Kronberger, nuclear physicist
 Sir Alan Marre, Second Permanent Secretary, Health; later Parliamentary Commissioner for Administration
 Sir Claus Moser, Lord Moser, government statistician

Finance
 Sir Ernest Cassel, banker
 Sir Ronald Cohen, Egypt-born businessman and Labour party supporter
 Moses da Costa, also called Anthony da Costa
Abraham and Benjamin Goldsmid, brothers, leading financiers and philanthropists
Sir Isaac Lyon Goldsmid, financier, a leading figure in Jewish emancipation and in the foundation of University College London
 Dudley Joel, financier
 Solomon Joel, financier
 Lord Levene of Portsoken, Peter Keith Levene, chairman of Lloyd's of London, Lord Mayor of London (1998–1999)
 Aaron of Lincoln, 12th-century financier
 Moses Haim Montefiore, financier and philanthropist
 Nathan Mayer Rothschild, financier and banker
 Joseph Salvador, first Jewish director of the British East India Company
 Barons Swaythling, bankers
 Samuel Montagu, 1st Baron Swaythling

Law
 Sir John Balcombe, Lord Justice of Appeal
 Judah P. Benjamin, American exile, lawyer
 Herbert Bentwich, lawyer and Zionist leader
 Norman Bentwich, lawyer and Attorney-General of Palestine; son of Herbert Benwitch
 His Honour Gerald Butler, Q.C., judge
 Alex Carlile, Baron Carlile of Berriew, QC (former Liberal Democrat MP and peer, now independent from 2017)
 Arthur Cohen, QC and politician
 Lionel Cohen, Baron Cohen, Lord of Appeal
 Myrella Cohen, judge, QC and agunah campaigner
 Lawrence Collins, Baron Collins of Mapesbury, Justice of the Supreme Court of the United Kingdom
 Hazel Cosgrove, Lady Cosgrove, Scottish Queen's Counsel and sheriff
 David Daube, Professor of Law
 Dame Hazel Genn
 Sir Francis Henry Goldsmid, MP for Reading, first Jewish barrister (Q.C. 1858)
 Sir David Lionel Goldsmid-Stern-Salomons, barrister
 Peter Goldsmith, Baron Goldsmith, Attorney General
 Arthur Lehman Goodhart, jurist
 William Goodhart, Baron Goodhart, human rights lawyer and politician (son of Arthur Goodhart)
 Arnold Goodman, Baron Goodman, solicitor
 Dame Rose Heilbron, Britain's first female Q.C., judge
 Rosalyn Higgins, President of the International Court of Justice
 Rufus Isaacs, 1st Marquess of Reading, lawyer and politician
 Sir George Jessel, Solicitor General for England and Wales, later Master of the Rolls
 Anthony Julius, prominent lawyer for Princess Diana, and against David Irving
 Neville Laski, judge
 Hersch Lauterpacht
 Brian Leveson, Lord Justice of Appeal.
 Leone Levi, barrister and statistician
 George Henry Lewis, 
 Gavin Lightman, judge; son of Harold Lightman
 Harold Lightman, barrister, father of Gavin Lightman and Stafford Lightman
  Sir Alan Mocatta, judge
 Victor Mishcon, Baron Mishcon, solicitor
 David Neuberger, Baron Neuberger of Abbotsbury, Justice of the Supreme Court of the United Kingdom; son of Albert Neuberger, brother of James Neuberger and Michael Neuberger, and brother-in-law of Julia Neuberger
 David Pearl, judge
 Nicholas Phillips, Baron Phillips of Worth Matravers, President of the Supreme Court of the United Kingdom
 Sir Bernard Rix, Lord Justice of Appeal (2000–)
 Leonard Sainer, solicitor and retailer
 Cyril Salmon, Judge
 Fiona Shackleton, solicitor who has acted for the royal family and Paul McCartney
 Lewis Silkin, 1st Baron Silkin, solicitor
 Linda Joy Stern, Q.C., prosecutor and judge
 Julius Stone
 Eldred Tabachnik, Q.C., former president of the Board of Deputies of British Jews
 Peter Taylor, Baron Taylor of Gosforth, Q.C., former Lord Chief Justice
 Vivian Wineman, former president of the Board of Deputies of British Jews
 Harry Woolf, Baron Woolf, former Lord Chief Justice, Q.C., former Master of the Rolls

Manufacturing
 Sir Leon Bagrit, pioneer of automation
 Sir Monty Finniston, industrialist
 David Gestetner, inventor
 Joseph Kagan, Baron Kagan, clothes manufacturer and disgraced friend of Prime Minister Harold Wilson
 Sir Emmanuel Kaye, industrialist and philanthropist
 Lord Alan Sugar, founder and chairman of Amstrad (1968–2007)
 Sir Robert Waley-Cohen, industrialist
 Arnold Weinstock, Lord Weinstock, Chairman of GEC

Media
 Emma Barnett, radio presenter
 Rachel Beer, newspaper editor
 Rafael Behr, journalist
 Sidney Bernstein, cinema owner
 Benjamin Cohen, Channel 4 News reporter and presenter
 Richard Desmond, publisher, Chairman of the Daily Express Group
 André Deutsch, publisher
 Jonathan Freedland, journalist and author
 Hadley Freeman, journalist
 Tanya Gold, journalist
 Lew Grade, founder of ATV
 Michael Grade, Chairman of the BBC from 2004 to 2006 and executive chairman of ITV plc from 2007 to 2009.
 Michael Green, founder of Carlton Television
 Miles Jacobson OBE, owner and founder of Sports Interactive and inventor of Football Manager
 Sydney Jacobson, newspaper editor
 Natasha Kaplinsky, newsreader, TV presenter
 Joseph Moses Levy, owner of the Daily Telegraph
 Edward Levy-Lawson, 1st Baron Burnham, newspaper proprietor
 Robert Maxwell, publisher
 Suzy Menkes, fashion journalist
 Victoria Coren Mitchell, writer, presenter and professional poker player 
 David Patrikarakos, journalist
 Robert Peston, TV reporter
 Melanie Phillips, journalist
 Stephen Pollard, editor and journalist
 Gail Rebuck, publisher [www.independent.co.uk/life-style/interview-gail-warning-1154352.html]
 Paul Reuter, founder of Reuters
 Rachel Riley, television presenter and co-host of Countdown
 Jacob Rothschild, 4th Baron Rothschild, Non-Executive Deputy Chairman of the Board, British SKY Broadcasting Group PLC
 Joshua Rozenberg, journalist
 Maurice Saatchi, Baron Saatchi and Charles Saatchi, founders of Saatchi and Saatchi
 Richard Sharp (BBC chairman), BBC chairman
 Martin Sorrell, founder of the WPP Group
 George Weidenfeld, publisher

Military
Sir Edward Brampton, godson of King Edward IV, a knight and commander during the War of the Roses
 Frank Alexander de Pass, World War I British Indian Army Victoria Cross recipient
 Albert Goldsmid, colonel
 Frederick John Goldsmid, general
 Thomas William Gould, World War II Royal Navy Victoria Cross recipient
 John Patrick Kenneally, World War II British Army Victoria Cross recipient (Jewish father)
 Issy Smith, World War I British Army Victoria Cross recipient
 Peter Stevens, World War II bomber pilot/POW and recipient of the Military Cross for numerous escape activities; a German-Jewish refugee living in London at the outbreak of hostilities; born Georg Franz HEIN in Hanover; committed identity theft in order to join the RAF; was naturalized a British citizen in 1946
 Wing Commander Roland Robert Stanford Tuck, DSO, DFC and Two Bars, AFC (1916-1987), RAF fighter pilot, Battle of Britain and Battle of France (27 air-to-air kills), English Electric Canberra test pilot
 Jack White, World War I British Army Victoria Cross recipient

Property
 Jack Cotton, property developer
 David Garrard, property developer
Artin Eli, property developer
Poju Zabludowicz, owner of Tamares Group

Retail
 David Alliance, Baron Alliance, businessman and Liberal Democrat politician
 Sir Victor Blank, chairman of GUS
 Sir Montague Burton, retailer
 Sir Charles Clore, owner of Selfridges
 Jack Cohen, founder of Tesco
 Ralph and David Gold, founders of Ann Summers and co-owners of Birmingham City football club
 Sir Philip Green, owner of Bhs, Arcadia Group
 Irene Howard, English costume designer; sister of actor Leslie Howard
 Stanley Kalms, now Baron Kalms of Edgware, life president of Dixons Group PLC
 Bernard Lewis, founder of River Island
 David Lewis, department store founder
 Michael Marks, co-founder of Marks & Spencer (born in the Russian Empire)
 Simon Marks, chairman of Marks & Spencer
 Gerald Ronson, business tycoon and philanthropist
 Marcus Samuel, founder of the "Shell" Transport and Trading Company
 Israel Sieff, chairman of Marks & Spencer
 Joseph Stillitz, founder and chairman of Gor-Ray
 Lord Alan Sugar, founder of Amstrad and star of The Apprentice (UK)
 Isaac Wolfson, founder of GUS plc; philanthropist

Police
 Henry Solomon, Chief Constable of Brighton Borough 1838 to 1844

Political figures

 See List of British Jewish politicians.

Religious and communal leaders
 Jacob Abendana, Haham of the Spanish and Portuguese Jews
 Barnett Abrahams, Dayan, Principal of Jews' College
 Israel Abrahams, scholar and educator
 Yehezkel Abramsky, rabbi and dayan
 Hermann Adler, Chief Rabbi
 Nathan Marcus Adler, Chief Rabbi
 Benjamin Artom, Haham of the Spanish and Portuguese Jews
 Rabbi Dr. Tony Bayfield, head of the Movement for Reform Judaism
 Leo Baeck, German-born Rabbi, scholar, theologian 
 Jon Benjamin, Chief Executive, Board of Deputies of British Jews
 Moses Berlin, 19th-century British Reform rabbi
 Lionel Blue, Reform rabbi and broadcaster
 Shmuley Boteach, American-born Orthodox rabbi, author, and TV and radio host
 Sir Israel Brodie, Chief Rabbi
 Felix Carlebach, German-born rabbi
 Eli Cashdan, rabbi
 Isidore Epstein, rabbi, Principal of Jews' College
 Harry Freedman, rabbi
 Moses Gaster, Haham of the Spanish and Portuguese Jews
 Sir Hermann Gollancz, rabbi and educator
 Aaron Hart, Chief Rabbi
 Joseph H. Hertz, Chief Rabbi
 Shmuel Yitzchak Hillman, rabbi and dayan
 Solomon Hirschell, Chief Rabbi
 Moses Hyamson, acting Chief Rabbi
 Louis Jacobs, rabbi and educator
 Laura Janner-Klausner, Senior Rabbi of the Movement for Reform Judaism
 Immanuel Jakobovits, Baron Jakobovits, Chief Rabbi
 Nathan S. Joseph
 Casriel Dovid Kaplin, rabbi and dayan
 James Kennard, rabbi and educationalist
 Hart Lyon, Chief Rabbi
 Frederick de Sola Mendes, rabbi
 Solomon Mestel, British rabbi
 Ewen Montagu, President of the United Synagogue
 Claude Montefiore, lay synagogue leader
 Julia Neuberger, Reform Rabbi
 David Nieto, Haham of the Spanish and Portuguese Jews
 Isaac Nieto, Haham of the Spanish and Portuguese Jews
 Michael Plaskow, minister
 Jonathan Romain, rabbi
 Sir Anthony Rothschild, first president of the United Synagogue
 Lord Jonathan Sacks, Chief Rabbi
 Solomon Marcus Schiller-Szinessy, rabbi and first Jewish professor in Cambridge
 Elyakim Schlesinger, rabbi 
 Joseph ben Yehuda Leib Shapotshnick, rabbi
 Simeon Singer, rabbi
 Simon Waley Waley, lay leader
 Chaim Weizmann, Zionist leader
 Jonathan Wittenberg, Massorti rabbi

Show business
 See List of British Jewish entertainers.

Sports

Aviation 
Diana Barnato Walker, the first British woman to break the sound barrier

Boxing
 Barney Aaron (Young), English-born US lightweight, Hall of Fame
 Jackie Kid Berg, Junior Welterweight Champion (IBHOF), wore a Star of David on his trunks
 Roman Greenberg, IBO intercontinental heavyweight champion
 Gary Jacobs, Scottish, British, Commonwealth, and European (EBU) champion welterweight
 Ted "Kid" Lewis (Gershon Mendeloff), world welterweight champion 1915–16, 1917–19
 Daniel Mendoza, 18th-century heavyweight world champion, family relative of actor Peter Sellers and Mike Mendoza (talksport), radio and television presenter
 Dutch Sam (Samuel Elias), boxing pioneer known as "The Terrible Jew"
 Young Dutch Sam, bare-knuckle boxing pioneer
 Sid Smith, world flyweight champion in 1913
 Matt Wells, lightweight and welterweight champion, in 1911 and 1914
 Charley White (Charles Anchowitz), lightweight boxer from 1906 until 1923

Cricket
 Mike Barnard, England, cricketer
 Mark Bott, England, cricketer
 Darren Gerard, England, cricketer
 Steven Herzberg, English-born Australian, cricketer
 Bev Lyon, England, cricketer
 Dar Lyon, England, cricketer (brother of Bev)
 John Raphael, England, batsman
 Fred Trueman, cricketer (Jewish ancestry)

Fencing
 Allan Jay, British (épée and foil), Olympic two-time silver, world champion
 Edgar Seligman (1867–1958), British (épée, foil, and sabre), Olympic two-time silver (épée), two-time British champion in each weapon

Football (association, soccer)
David Beckham, England, retired footballer
 Nick Blackman, England, winger 
 George Cohen, Fulham and England's 1966 World Cup team, full back
 Bradley Goldberg, England, forward
 Joe Jacobson, Wales, left back (Wycombe Wanderers)
 Scott Kashket, England, striker for Wycombe Wanderers
 Josh Kennet, England, midfielder/right back (Maccabi Herzliya)
 Mark Lazarus, England, right winger
 Tom Rosenthal

Motorsport
 Sheila van Damm, British rally driver

Rowing
 Zoe De Toledo, Olympic medalist
 Josh West, American-born British, men's eight, Olympic silver, 2x World Rowing Championships silver and one bronze

Rugby league
 Lewis Harris, England, English rugby league

Rugby union
 Aaron Liffchak, England, prop, England national team
 Alan Menter, England/South Africa,  national team
 John Raphael, Belgium/England,  national team

Sailing
 Tony Bullimore, British, yachtsman
 Peter Jaffe, Great Britain, Olympic silver (yachting; star-class)

Table tennis
 Viktor Barna (born "Győző Braun"), Hungary/Britain, 22-time world champion, International Table Tennis Foundation Hall of Fame (ITTFHoF)
 Richard Bergmann, Austria/Britain, seven-time world champion, ITTFHoF
 Benny Casofsky, English Swaythling Cup player
 Jeff Ingber
 Hyman Lurie, English three-time world bronze medallist
 Ivor Montagu, Britain, national team

Tennis
 Angela Buxton, England, won 1956 French Women's Doubles (w/Althea Gibson) and 1956 Wimbledon Women's Doubles (w/Gibson), highest world ranking # 9
 Daniel Prenn, Germany and Britain, highest world ranking, #6

Track and field
 Harold Abrahams, Britain, sprinter, Olympic champion (100-metre sprint) and silver (4x100-m relay) who was immortalized in the film Chariots of Fire
 Sir Sidney Abrahams, Britain, Olympic long jumper
 Jo Ankier, Britain, record holder (1,500m & 3,000m steeplechase)
Harry Kane, Britain, Olympic hurdler

Weightlifting
 Ben Helfgott, Polish-born British, three-time British champion (lightweight), three-time Maccabiah champion; survived Buchenwald and Theresienstadt concentration camps, as all but one other of his family were killed by the Nazis
 Edward Lawrence Levy, Great Britain, world weightlifting champion; 14 world records

Wrestling
 Noam Dar, Israeli-born Scottish wrestler
 Fred Oberlander, Austrian, British, and Canadian wrestler; world champion (freestyle heavyweight); Maccabiah champion
 Samuel Rabin, Great Britain, Olympic bronze (freestyle middleweight)

Other sports
 Ludwig Guttmann, founder of the Paralympics
 David Pleat, former football manager
 Barry Silkman, footballer and agent
 David Triesman, former Chairman of the Football Association

Philanthropists 
 Bernhard Baron, cigarette maker and philanthropist
 Sir Clive Bourne, philanthropist
 Dame Vivien Duffield, philanthropist, daughter of Sir Charles Clore
 Joseph Duveen, 1st Baron Duveen of Millbank
 Anna Maria Goldsmid, philanthropist
 Sir Basil Henriques, philanthropist
 Maurice de Hirsch, banker and philanthropist
 Samuel Lewis, financier and philanthropist
 Sir Robert Mayer, philanthropist
 Frederic David Mocatta, philanthropist

Miscellaneous
 Barney Barnato, diamond miner
 Jack Beddington, advertising executive
 Neil Blair, literary agent
 William Buzaglo, self-proclaimed inventor
 Antonio Fernandez Carvajal, merchant, first Jew to be naturalised as a British citizen
 Jeremiah Duggan, possible murder victim
 Brian Epstein (1934-1967), music entrepreneur who discovered and managed the Beatles
 Michael Foster, talent agent 
 Alexander Goldberg, human rights activist, chaplain and barrister
 Henry Edward Goldsmid, East India Company servant
 Kurt Hahn, educationalist
 Nathaniel Isaacs, explorer
 Aaron Kosminski, suspect in the Jack the Ripper case
 Gottlieb Wilhelm Leitner (1840–1899), educationist and orientalist
 Sir Solomon de Medina, army contractor, first English Jew to be knighted
 Nigella Lawson, celebrity chef
 Chava Mond, model
 Dorrit Moussaieff, Israeli-British businesswoman, entrepreneur, philanthropist and the First Lady of Iceland
 Yotam Ottolenghi, celebrity chef, food writer 
 Don Pacifico, cause of the Pacifico incident
 Krystyna Skarbek, spy
 Sir Bernard Waley-Cohen, Lord Mayor of London
 Sir Jame-Landold, Lord Mayor of London

See also
History of the Jews in England
History of the Jews in Scotland
History of the Jews in Ireland
List of British Jewish entertainers
List of British Jewish nobility and gentry
List of British Jewish politicians
List of British Jewish scientists
List of British Jewish writers
Lists of Jews
List of Britons

References

Bibliography
Celmins, Martin. Peter Green: The Authorized Biography. London: Sanctuary Publishing, Ltd.; 3rd edition, 2003. pp. 23–32.
 JYB = Jewish Year Book (annual)
 "Obituary: Sir Edward Sassoon". The Times, Saturday, 25 May 1912; pg. 11; Issue 39908; col C.
  TimesAd: The Times, 6/7/06 p34: "A Call by Jews in Britain" (advert signed by 300 British Jews)
 David S. Katz, The Jews in the History of England, 1485–1850 (Oxford: Oxford University Press, 1994). xvi, 447 pp.

 
Jews
Lists of Jews
Jews,British